Borum is a village in Aarhus Municipality, Central Denmark Region in Denmark. Borum is situated 2.5 kilometres south of Sabro and 3 kilometres west of the Aarhus suburb of Tilst and has a population of 300 (1 January 2022). About 2 kilometres west of Borum is the village of Herskind.

The village has an active community centered on the village hall, with amateur theatre, film club, choir, cooking, gymnastics, markets, etc.. Just south of Borum is the stream of Lyngbygård Å. The stream feeds Årslev Engsø and the Aarhus River and parts of the river valley has recently been environmentally restored and reconstructed, with nature paths and trails.

Borum church 

Borum church is placed on an elevation in the south west, overlooking the village. The older Romanesque parts of the small church is built from  granite ashlar. There are several stone carved decorations and church frescos in the church. A 43 x 32 cm grey granite stone with a chiselled sun cross from the Bronze Age was discovered in the 1890s, when an associated stone dyke was dismantled. It has been in possession of the National Museum of Denmark since 1902.

Prehistory 
The area of Borum has a very rich prehistory. North west of the village, towards the lake of Lading Sø, is an elevated plateau overlooking the surrounding landscape, with remains of several ancient tumuli. The most outstanding is Borum Eshøj, a tumuli grave from the Nordic Bronze Age and formerly one of the largest long barrows in Denmark. The site, which is a protected cultural heritage site, also holds remains of Bronze Age settlements, and a couple of contemporary houses have been reconstructed here.

References

Sources 
 Local historical archives for the Borum and Lyngby parishes 
 Official homepage for Borum 
 Borum church National Museum of Denmark  Summary in English

External links 

 
 Sabro-Borum

Towns and settlements in Aarhus Municipality
Cities and towns in Aarhus Municipality